Kenneth T. Henson is a retired professor of education at The Citadel, The Military College of South Carolina. He was the first dean of the School of Education from 2001 through 2004.  He retired in 2012.

Prior to his position at The Citadel he was the dean (1988–1999) and professor (1999–2001) at Eastern Kentucky University. He was also a professor and head of curriculum and instruction at the University of Alabama. He was the first director of the doctoral program at Delta State University.  He was also a professor of education at Indiana State University, Texas A & M University, and the University of Miami. He was a Fulbright scholar, 1971-1972. In 2000 he received the Association of Teacher Educators Distinguished Teacher Educator Award. He received the Franklin Silverman Lifetime Achievement Award from the Text and Academic Authors Association in 2008.

Publications
His 61 books include Supervision: A Collaborative Approach to Instructional Improvement; "Curriculum Planning: Integrating Multiculturalism, Constructivism, and Education Reform, fifth edition. Both by Waveland Press; .Teaching Today, 9th ed Pearson (co-authored); and "Writing for Publication, Second Edition, 2015, Amazon"

Education
 Bachelor of Science in Education from Auburn University, 1963
 Master of Education from the University of Florida, 1967
 Doctor of Education in Curriculum and Research from the University of Alabama, 1969

References

Living people
Auburn University alumni
Delta State University
Eastern Kentucky University faculty
Indiana State University faculty
Texas A&M University faculty
The Citadel, The Military College of South Carolina faculty
University of Alabama alumni
University of Alabama faculty
University of Florida alumni
University of Miami faculty
Year of birth missing (living people)